Paracymoriza gangeticalis is a moth in the family Crambidae. It was described by Julius Lederer in 1863. It is found in India.

References

Acentropinae
Moths described in 1863